Gourdon nicknamed Gurdin by the population, is a coastal fishing village in Aberdeenshire, Scotland, south of Inverbervie and north of Johnshaven, with a natural harbour. Its harbour was built in 1820. It was formerly in Kincardineshire. It is known for its close community and unique local dialect. It is a picturesque harbour village that boasts lovely views along the pathway to Inverbervie.

Gourdon was served by Gourdon railway station, on the Montrose and Bervie Railway from 1865 to 1951.

Community Groups 

Gourdon contains many prominent community groups:

Gourdon Mission Hall

Gourdon Mission Hall  is linked to Arbuthnott, Bervie and Kinneff Church.  Services are held every Sunday at 6pm.  The parish minister, Rev Andrew Morrison, takes the service once a month - usually the first Sunday of the month - with guest speakers taking the other weeks. In 2018, the Mission Hall celebrated its 150th anniversary.

Notable Residents 

 John Ritchie Cargill, 1892–1981, able seaman on the  during the rescue after the sinking of the Titanic.
 Reg Morrison, 1932–2006. Aberdeen Football Club goalkeeper.

Local Radio 

Alongside the commercial enterprise of the local newspaper, The Mearns Leader, Gourdon has a Local Community Radio Station in Mearns FM. Broadcasting from nearby Stonehaven in the Townhall, Mearns FM helps to keep Gourdon up to date with local and charity events, as well as playing a wee bit of music. Staffed completely by volunteers, Mearns FM is run as a not for profit organisation, broadcasting under a Community Radio licence, with a remit to provide local focus news events and programming. Jointly funded by local adverts and local and national grants. Mearns FM has one of the largest listening areas of any Community Radio Station owing to the Mearns' distributed population, Mearns FM was set up to try to bring these distant communities together.

References

External links
Gourdon at Knowhere
Photographs of Gourdon

Villages in Aberdeenshire